Big Big World is a 2016 Turkish drama film directed by Reha Erdem. It was screened in the Horizions section at the 73rd Venice International Film Festival.

Cast
 Berke Karaer as Ali
 Ecem Uzun as Zuhal
 Melisa Akman as Falci
 Murat Deniz as Tamirci
 Ayta Sözeri as Hayat Kadını

References

External links
 

2016 films
2016 drama films
Turkish drama films
2010s Turkish-language films